Time reversal may refer to:
Reverse motion – a visual effect in which reversing the order of the frames of a film or video makes time appear to run backward
Reverse tape effects – an audio effect in which reversing the direction of an audio recording renders sounds backward
T-symmetry (or time reversal symmetry) – the expected symmetry of physical laws independent of whether time runs forward or backward
Time reversibility – the ability of some processes to operate in either direction of time
Time reversal signal processing – a technique for focusing acoustic and electromagnetic waves by reversing in time a system's response signals
Time travel – theorised and speculative concepts about traveling into the past or the future